Oronsay (Gaelic Orasaigh) is a tidal island off North Uist in the Outer Hebrides. Lying to the north of Vallaquie Strand, the island has been uninhabited since the Highland Clearances.

Footnotes

Uist islands
Cleared places in the Outer Hebrides
Uninhabited islands of the Outer Hebrides